Gerardo Celasco (born April 8, 1982), also known as Adrian Bellani, is an American actor. He was the second actor to play the role of Miguel Lopez-Fitzgerald on the NBC daytime drama, Passions.

Biography
As a child, Celasco moved to his parents' home country El Salvador with his family.  He received his schooling at the American School of El Salvador (Escuela Americana). There, he not only competed in international horse jumping competitions, but he won and was invited to compete in the AASCA Central America Games representing his country. Celasco also became a very accomplished volleyball player and once again he found himself invited to partake in the Central America Games. The team that he played for won the Central American tournament. Celasco was privileged to train with the El Salvador National team.

Celasco later returned to the United States to study finance at Southern Methodist University. He went on to receive a finance degree from Southern Methodist University in Dallas, Texas. Shortly after, Salvadoran fashion photographer Roberto Aguilar asked Celasco to be the face of the Toni & Guy Bed Head campaign. He also appeared in Frankie J's music video for his song "And I Had You There".

People en Español magazine voted him as one of the 25 hottest Latin bachelors in the world in 2006. Celasco played Miguel Lopez-Fitzgerald on the NBC daytime drama Passions from 2006 to 2007. In 2007, he appeared with Passions co-star Heidi Mueller on The Tyra Banks Show to help host Tyra through "soap opera school".

In 2019, Celasco appeared as Xavier Castillo in the ABC series How to Get Away with Murder.

Personal life
Celasco currently resides in Los Angeles but remains extremely close with his family and visits them often in San Salvador.

Selected filmography
(Passions) (2000-07) (Miguel Lopez-Fitzgerald)
(Heroes (American TV series) (2007) (Gilberto) (Four Months Ago...)
(Rizzoli & Isles) (2011) (Manny Vega, as Adrian Bellani) (Don't Hate the Player) 
(Moneyball (film) (2011) (Carlos Pena, as Adrian Bellani)
(Battleship (film) (2012) (Ensign Chavez, as Adrian Bellani)
(Cleaners (TV series) (2014) (Joshua, as Adrian Bellani) (The Caterpillar and the Butterfly, Welcome Home Sally)
(Person of Interest (TV series) (2014) (Tomas Koroa, as Adrian Bellani) (Honor Among Thieves (Person of Interest)
(The Haves and the Have Nots (TV series) (2014-15) (Carlos, as Adrian Bellani)
(The Player (2015 TV series) (Suarez, as Adrian Bellani) (L.A. Takedown)
(Bones (TV series) (2017) (Mark Kovac, as Gerard Celasco) (The Scare in the Score, The End in the End)
(StartUp (TV series) (2018) (Fernan) (Sweat Equity, Guerilla)
(S.W.A.T. (2017 TV series) (2019) (David Arias) (Los Huesos)
(How to Get Away with Murder) (2019-2020) (Xavier Castillo)
(Next (2020 TV series) (2020) (Ty Salazar, credit only in some episodes)
Good Sam (2022) (Dr. Nick Vega)
Devil in Ohio (2022) (Detective Lopez)

References

External links
 

1982 births
Living people
Male actors from Miami
American people of Salvadoran descent
American male soap opera actors
Hispanic and Latino American male actors
Southern Methodist University alumni